Castleknock Community College, is an Irish secondary school located on Carpenterstown Road in Castleknock, Fingal in Ireland. Established in 1995, the school is overseen by the Dublin and Dún Laoghaire Education and Training Board.

History
The school opened on 30 August 1995 in temporary accommodation at Hartstown Community School. An official visit by the Minister for Education, Niamh Bhreathnach, took place in December 1996. The first students sat the Leaving Certificate examination in June 2000. As of 2013, the school had an enrollment of over 1,100 students, and a teaching staff of 94 full-time and part-time teachers.
 
After a number of years of campaigning and protest, the school received previously promised funding in 2014 for a new sports hall and classrooms. Construction began in April 2014 and was completed in June 2015, with the new building opened in September 2015.

Operations
Castleknock Community College (or 'CCC' as it is sometimes known) is a co-educational post-primary school, with a comprehensive academic curriculum and a programme of extra-curricular activities.

The school also offers adult education classes.

References

External links
 

Castleknock
Secondary schools in Fingal